The  International Pharmaceutical Federation or  Fédération Internationale Pharmaceutique, abbreviated as  FIP, is a nongovernmental organization (NGO) in official relations with the World Health Organization. It is the global body representing over four million pharmacists, pharmaceutical scientists and pharmaceutical educators through 153 national organisations, academic institutional members and individual members.

Vision and Mission
FIP's vision is a world where everyone benefits from access to safe, effective, quality and affordable medicines and health technologies, as well as from pharmaceutical care services provided by pharmacists, in collaboration with other healthcare professionals.

Its mission is to support global health by enabling the advancement of pharmaceutical practice, sciences and education.

History
The Federation was founded on 25 September 1912 in The Hague, the Netherlands. It was the outcome of the series of international pharmaceutical congresses held in the nineteenth century, more specifically the congress held in Brussels in 1885. Following an initiative of the Royal Dutch Pharmaceutical Society in 1909, the 10th international pharmaceutical congress in 1910 in Brussels resolved to establish an international pharmaceutical federation in The Hague. The first president was Prof. Dr, Léopold of Italy, a professor at Leiden University. The first secretary-general was Dr. J.J. Hofman, pharmacist in The Hague.

Structure
FIP’s activities can be divided into three main areas — science, practice and education — led by its Board of Pharmaceutical Sciences, Board of Pharmaceutical Practice, and FIP Education, respectively. These work collaboratively towards FIP’s vision and mission.

Sciences 
Work to advance the pharmaceutical sciences globally is primarily done through six special interest groups (SIGs). There are SIGs for:
 Drug delivery and manufacturing
 New generation of pharmaceutical scientists
 New medicines
 Personalised and precision medicine 
 Pharmacy practice research
 Regulatory sciences and quality

Practice 

 A priority for FIP is to advance pharmacy practice in all settings, and this is led through the projects and initiatives of eight pharmacy practice sections. There are sections for: 
 Academic pharmacy 
 Clinical biology 
 Community pharmacy 
 Health and medicines information 
 Hospital pharmacy 
 Industrial pharmacy 
 Military and emergency pharmacy 
 Social and administrative pharmacy

Education 
The reform of pharmacy education (including pharmaceutical workforce development) is a third objective, and this is the purpose of FIP Education (FIPEd), which includes:

 Academic Pharmacy Section members (faculty members and educators); 
 Academic institutional members (deans of schools of pharmacy and pharmaceutical sciences); 
 A Workforce Development Hub of experts focused on academic capacity, early career training strategy, quality assurance, advances and specialist development, competency development, leadership development, advancing integrated services, working with others, continuing professional development strategies, equity and equality, impact and outcomes, pharmacy intelligence and policy development; 
 A Pharmacy Technicians and Support Workforce Strategic Platform and its advisory committee; and 
 The FIP-UNESCO UNITWIN programme (regional university networks to advance pharmaceutical education), which is a global partnership between FIP and UNESCO.  

FIP also directs effort towards supporting early career pharmacists and pharmaceutical scientists through its Early Career Pharmaceutical Group.

See also 
 Evidence-based pharmacy in developing countries
 History of pharmacy
 List of pharmacy associations
 List of pharmacy schools
 Pharmacy
 Pharmacist

References 

 FIP's vision, mission and strategic plan. The Hague: FIP. 2019

External links
 FIP website
 World Health Organization (WHO)

Pharmacy-related professional associations
Organizations established in 1912
Medical and health organisations based in the Netherlands
1912 establishments in the Netherlands
International medical and health organizations